A list of reference works on the film noir genre of film. See Bibliography of film by genre for other genres.

Books

Starman, Ray (2006)," TV Noir:the 20th Century", The Troy Bookmakers Press, Troy NY. 2nd edition, Amazon Books (2010), 
Bibliographies of film
Film noir